Cristian Andrés Omar Barinaga (born 5 February 1990) is an Argentine professional footballer who plays as a forward for Guaraní Antonio Franco.

Career
Barinaga's career started in 2005, featuring for Quilmes in the Argentine Primera División during 2005–06; making five appearances. Barinaga signed for Guaraní Antonio Franco in 2008, prior to agreeing to join 2 de Mayo of the Paraguayan Primera División. He scored goals against 3 de Febrero, Libertad and Olimpia over eleven appearances. He returned to Argentina in 2009, which preceded spells with top-flight Colón and second tier Defensa y Justicia. Having featured an overall ten times, Barinaga moved on to Primera B Nacional's Aldosivi in 2011. He scored in his second match, netting in a 5–1 win over Ferro Carril Oeste.

On 30 September 2011, Barinaga completed a return to Guaraní Antonio Franco. He remained with the club until 2016, during which time he made over one hundred and eight appearances and scored forty-eight goals; as the club rose from Torneo Argentino B in 2011 to Primera B Nacional in 2014. Barinaga left Guaraní Antonio Franco midway through the 2016–17 Torneo Federal A, joining eventual champions Agropecuario. He scored three goals in nine games in 2016–17, with the forward subsequently scoring on his Primera B Nacional debut for Agropecuario during a win over Guillermo Brown on 30 September 2017.

Career statistics
.

Honours
Agropecuario
 Torneo Federal A: 2016–17

References

External links

1990 births
Living people
Footballers from La Plata
Argentine footballers
Association football forwards
Argentine expatriate footballers
Expatriate footballers in Paraguay
Argentine expatriate sportspeople in Paraguay
Argentine Primera División players
Torneo Argentino B players
Paraguayan Primera División players
Primera Nacional players
Torneo Argentino A players
Torneo Federal A players
Quilmes Atlético Club footballers
Guaraní Antonio Franco footballers
2 de Mayo footballers
Club Atlético Colón footballers
Defensa y Justicia footballers
Aldosivi footballers
Club Agropecuario Argentino players
San Martín de San Juan footballers
Chaco For Ever footballers